Central Post Office may refer to:

 Buenos Aires Central Post Office
 Central Post Office Building (Jerusalem)
 Kowloon Central Post Office
 Central Post Office (Kyiv)
 Manila Central Post Office
 Central Post Office (Ottawa)
 Saigon Central Post Office
 Central Post Office Building (Santiago)
 Central Post Office Building (Stockholm)

See also
 Post office
 General Post Office (disambiguation)